Pedruel is a locality located in the municipality of Bierge, in Huesca province, Aragon, Spain. As of 2020, it has a population of 5.

Geography 
Pedruel is located 62km east-northeast of Huesca.

References

Populated places in the Province of Huesca